Donny Gillies (born 1974 in Ottawa, Canada) is a San Francisco artist and designer best known for his work with metal band Metallica and Stern Pinball. Donny’s early career started with gig posters for local underground Ottawa bands and sign painting for local bars that eventually led to painting, airbrushing, design and illustration work with a large selection of clients including Swedish rock band The Hellacopters and later Metallica, Snap-on Tools, Stern Pinball, Fender Guitars, Dunlop, Powell Peralta, Vans, Creature skateboards, Kid Robot and Pabst Blue Ribbon.
His influenaces include: Frank Frazetta, Jack Kirby, Chris Foss, and Ed Roth.

Recent works
Donny's art has been featured in various books including Juztapoz Car Culture, Gig Posters volume 2, Kustom Graphics, Kustom Graphics 2, Pinstripe Planet, Surf Graphics, Speedseakers, Tiki Art Now, Electric Frankenstein; High energy rock n roll posters.

He is featured in The Lowdown On Lowbrow artist documentary and Mad Fabricators Art and Car documentary series.

Donny has created bass guitars for Maya Ford of the Donnas, and Robert Trujillo of Metallica.
PaPa-Het guitar for James Hetfield of Metallica. Custom Metallica band pinball machine, which led to Gillies doing the artwork for a production Metallica pinball machine.

Published works
 Monster Revolt, The Art of Dirty Donny Schiffer Books, 2010
 Pinball Wizards and Blacklight Destroyers: The Art of Dirty Donny Gillies Schiffer Books, 2016

See also 
Lowbrow (art movement)
Airbrush
Illustrator
Designer
Stern Pinball

Video
 James Hetfield's custom cigar store Indian
 Coin-Op TV
 Mad Fabricators DVD #5
 The Lowdown on Lowbrow (Canadian TV)

References

 Metallica Guitars
 Gravyzine
 Desk Space
 The Big Beat

External links
 Dirty Donny's official website
 Dirty Donny's blog
 The Ottawa Citizen
 Montreal Mirror,
 Tiki art now: a volcanic eruption of art

1974 births
Artists from Ottawa
Living people
Canadian poster artists
Canadian graphic designers